James S. Thorp (February 7, 1937 – May 2, 2018) was the head of the Bradley Department of Electrical and Computer Engineering at Virginia Tech. He was the Hugh P. and Ethel C. Kelly Professor Emeritus & Research Professor. He received all his degrees (B.S. 1959, M.S. 1961, and Ph.D. 1962) from Cornell University.  Professor Thorp was a teacher, a researcher, and for many years served as the director, in the School of Electrical and Computer Engineering at Cornell, where he worked for 42 years, 1962-2004.

Along with fellow Virginia Tech professor Arun G. Phadke, Thorp received The Franklin Institute's 2008 Benjamin Franklin Medal in Electrical Engineering  for their contributions to the power industry, particularly microprocessor controllers in electric power systems that have significantly decreased the occurrence and duration of power blackouts. He was elected to the National Academy of Engineering in 1996 for his "contributions to the development of digital techniques for power system protection, monitoring, and control" and also was an IEEE Fellow (since 1989).

References

1937 births
2018 deaths
Virginia Tech faculty
Cornell University alumni
Members of the United States National Academy of Engineering
American electrical engineers
Fellow Members of the IEEE